The Mole River, a watercourse that is one of the Border Rivers and part of the Macintyre catchment within the Murray–Darling basin, is located in the Northern Tablelands region of New South Wales, Australia.

Course and features
Sourced from the western slopes of the Great Dividing Range, the river rises at the confluence of Deepwater River and Bluff River, west of Sandy Flat, and flows generally to the west before reaching its confluence with the Dumaresq River, near the village of Mole River; descending  over its  course.

The Mole River is one of the remotest headwaters of the Murray-Darling basin; and the area drained is hilly and rocky.

In 2007, Tenterfield Shire Council called for a dam to be constructed on the Mole River.

See also

 Rivers of New South Wales

References

External links
 

Rivers of New South Wales
Murray-Darling basin
Tweed Shire